Nikolaos "Nikos" Pettas  (Greek: Νικόλαος "Νίκος" Πέττας; born February 28, 1981) is a Greek professional basketball player. He is a 6 ft 4  in (1.95 m) tall shooting guard-small forward.

Professional career
Pettas began playing basketball with the junior teams of Olympiacos. With the senior men's team of Olympiacos, he played in the 1997 McDonald's Championship Final, against the Chicago Bulls. The first season of his pro career, was in the Greek League, during the 1998–99 season. He played in the European-wide 3rd-tier level FIBA EuroChallenge, during the 2007–08 season, with Olympias Patras.

National team career
Pettas was a member of the junior national teams of Greece. With Greece's junior national teams, he played at the following tournaments: the 1997 FIBA Europe Under-16 Championship, the 1998 FIBA Europe Under-18 Championship, where he won a bronze medal, the 1999 FIBA Under-19 World Championship, and the 2000 FIBA Europe Under-20 Championship.

References

External links
FIBA Profile
FIBA Europe Profile
Eurobasket.com Profile
Draftexpress.com Profile
Greek Basket League Profile 
Greek Basket League Profile 
Hellenic Federation Profile 

1981 births
Living people
Aigaleo B.C. players
Apollon Patras B.C. players
Diagoras Dryopideon B.C. players
Doxa Lefkadas B.C. players
Ethnikos Piraeus B.C. players
Greek men's basketball players
Greek Basket League players
Ionikos N.F. B.C. players
Irakleio B.C. players
Koroivos B.C. players
Milon B.C. players
Olympiacos B.C. players
Olympias Patras B.C. players
Point guards
Promitheas Patras B.C. players
Psychiko B.C. players
Shooting guards
Small forwards
Trikala B.C. players
Basketball players from Athens